Hotel Salvation (known in India as Mukti Bhawan) is a 2016 Indian film written and directed by Shubhashish Bhutiani and produced by Sanjay Bhutiani. The film is a comedy-drama about a son who is forced to set his job aside to accompany his elderly father to the holy city of Varanasi. It stars Adil Hussain and Lalit Behl in the lead roles. The film received four nominations at the 63rd Filmfare Awards, including Best Film (Critics).

Plot
Mukti Bhawan follows the story of a reluctant son who must take his father to the holy city of Varanasi, where his father believes he will breathe his last and attain salvation. 
When a 77-year-old man, Daya, wakes up from a strange nightmare, he knows his time is up and he must get to Varanasi immediately in hope of dying there to attain salvation. His dutiful son, Rajiv, is left with no choice but to drop everything and make the journey with his stubborn father, leaving behind his wife and daughter.
The two of them check into MuktiBhawan, a hotel devoted to people hoping to spend their last days there. Rajiv finds himself having to take care of his father for the first time in his life. 
While Rajiv struggles to juggle his responsibilities back home, Daya starts to bloom as he finds a sense of community in the hotel, and a companion in the 75-year old Vimla. 
As the days go by and Daya shows no sign of dying, Rajiv is faced with the dilemma of whether to remain there with his father or fulfill his duty back home.

Cast
 Adil Hussain as Rajiv
 Lalit Behl as Daya
 Geetanjali Kulkarni as Lata
 Palomi Ghosh as Sunita
 Navnindra Behl as Vimla
 Anil K Rastogi as Mishraji

Release

Mukti Bhawan had its world premiere on September 2, 2016 at the 73rd Venice International Film Festival while in India its release date was April 7, 2017.

Reception

Box office 
The film was initially a box office failure in India, where it only grossed  domestically. However, the film has been a box office success overseas, particularly in Japan, where it ran in theaters for 100 days and then 150 days. The film also grossed $80,862 in other overseas territories, including South Korea, Spain, the United Kingdom, and United Arab Emirates.

Critical response
The film received universal critical acclaim. On Rotten Tomatoes, it has an approval rating of 100% based on 23 reviews, with an average rating of 7.53/10. The site's consensus reads: "Tender, perceptive, and beautifully filmed, Hotel Salvation tells a father-son story whose universal themes are further enriched by its picturesque setting". On Metacritic, another review aggregator, the film has a score of 80 out of 100 based on 4 critics, indicating "generally favorable reviews". Leslie Felperin of The Guardian gave the film a rating of 4 stars out of 5 and said that, "Shubhashish Bhutiani’s dreamy comedy drama about a businessman embarking on a final journey with his father is smart, spellbinding and achingly relatable". David Parkinson of Empire gave the film a rating of 4 stars out of 5 and said that, "Filmed on a modest budget with a subtle sense of place and pace, this highly impressive debut considers mortality with a wry compassion that's rare for such a young director".

Rajeev Masand gave the film a rating of 4 stars out of 5 saying that, "Mukti Bhawan is as much a celebration of life – complete with all its complexities and paradoxes – as it is a meditation on the harsh realities of getting old and dying. It is both poignant and uplifting. Beautifully shot and although languidly paced, Bhutiani delivers an evocative drama that has surely got to be one of the best films you’ll see this year." Raja Sen of NDTV gave the film a rating of 4.5 stars out of 5 and concluded his review by saying that, "In the way companionship and clarity can be found without looking. In the way an accountant works at learning to cook. In the way soap operas provide succour. Somewhere in the middle of this beautiful, meditative film comes the greatest lesson of all: that a perfect, poetic goodbye doesn't have to wait for the end.". Shubhra Gupta of The Indian Express gave the film a rating of 3.5 stars out of 5 and said that, "There’s much to like about Mukti Bhawan. It brings to us themes which are either ignored or dealt with in our cinema with mawkishness and heavy sentimentality. Bhutiani removes the cloyingness and replaces it with a moving matter-of-fact acceptance of the final destination: this is a director to watch out for."

Nihit Bhave of The Times of India gave the film a rating of 3.5 stars out of 5 and said that, "Bhutiani has assembled a stellar cast of theatre greats and indie-film favourites. Behl and Hussain are endearing as the father-son duo, frustrated by and fond of each other simultaneously. The plot is too skimpy and with its languid pacing, the movie eventually seems a bit indulgent. The filmmaker’s exposure to slow, contemplative festival films becomes apparent. But the unassuming characters and the humour make it a delightful watch." Sukanya Verma of Rediff gave the film a rating of 4 stars out of 5 and concluded her review by saying that, "Mukti Bhawan is a work of staggering depth and sublime vision".

Awards and nominations

References

External links
 
 

Films shot in Varanasi
2010s Hindi-language films
2016 films
Films set in Uttar Pradesh
Films about death
Films set in hotels
Culture of Varanasi
Special Mention (feature film) National Film Award winners
2016 directorial debut films